Anilios is a genus of snakes in the family Typhlopidae, first described on 1845 by John Edward Gray.

Geographic range
Species of the genus Anilios are found predominantly in Australia, with a few species located in New Guinea.

Species
The following 48 species are recognized as being valid.
Anilios affinis 
Anilios ammodytes 
Anilios aspina 
Anilios australis 
Anilios batillus 
Anilios bicolor 
Anilios bituberculatus 
Anilios broomi 
Anilios centralis 
Anilios chamodracaena 
Anilios diversus 
Anilios endoterus 
Anilios erycinus 
Anilios fossor  
Anilios ganei 
Anilios grypus 
Anilios guentheri 
Anilios hamatus 
Anilios howi 
Anilios insperatus 
Anilios kimberleyensis 
Anilios leptosoma 
Anilios leucoproctus 
Anilios ligatus 
Anilios longissimus 
Anilios margaretae 
Anilios micromma 
Anilios minimus 
Anilios nema 
Anilios nigrescens 
Anilios obtusifrons 
Anilios pilbarensis 
Anilios pinguis 
Anilios proximus 
Anilios robertsi 
Anilios silvia 
Anilios splendidus 
Anilios systenos 
Anilios torresianus 
Anilios tovelli 
Anilios troglodytes 
Anilios unguirostris 
Anilios vagurima 
Anilios waitii  
Anilios wiedii  
Anilios yampiensis 
Anilios yirrikalae 
Anilios zonula 

Nota bene: A binomial authority in parentheses indicates that the species was originally described in a genus other than Anilios.

References

 
Snake genera
Taxa named by John Edward Gray